Ammana Mane is a 2019 Indian Kannada-language drama film directed by Nikhil Manjoo Lingaiah and starring Raghavendra Rajkumar and Rohini Nagesh. The film is based on a book by Sri Lalithe.

Cast 
Raghavendra Rajkumar as Rajeeva
Rohini Nagesh as Rajeeva's mother
Sheetal Hemanth as Shive, Rajeeva's daughter 
Manasi Sudhir as Rajeeva's wife
Suchendra Prasad as a judge
Nikhil Manjoo as a police inspector
Chaitra
Tabla Nani

Production 
Raghavendra Rajkumar, was signed to make an acting comeback after fifteen years as an antagonist the film Chillam. However, he dropped out of the venture and was cast in the main role in a film by Nikhil Manjoo. In the film, he plays a man who is akin to himself: strong despite having health issues. The film also explores the relationship between a mother (played by Rohini Nagesh) and her son (played by Raghavendra Rajkumar). The mother-son relationship is inspired by Raghavendra Rajkumar's real life relationship with his mother, Parvathamma Rajkumar. Initial reports in 2018 suggested that B. Jayashree would play his mother in the film; however, these reports proved to be false.

Soundtrack 
The songs were composed by Sameera Kulkarni. All tracks were sung by Raghavendra Rajkumar.

Reception 
A critic from The Times of India gave the film a rating of two-and-half out of five stars and wrote that "Ammana Mane touches upon some relevant issues and there is some occasional poignancy in the narrative, but the film ends up being jarring with regards to showcasing sentiments, and the pace doesn't help that either". A critic from Deccan Chronicle  gave the film three out of five stars and wrote that "Naturally slow and steady makes it a meaningful watch in the end with Raghavendra Rajkumar at his challenging best. He is ably supported with the performances of others too". A critic from The New Indian Express gave the film a rating of three out of five and wrote that "As for the audience, this film has managed to create a niche, and is able to hold the attention of the audience throughout the two-hour long run. The plot drifts through a lot of ups and downs similar to the ones experienced in every middle-class family life".

Awards and nominations

References

External links 

2019 films
2019 drama films
Indian drama films
2010s Kannada-language films